The Chilean elaenia (Elaenia chilensis) is a species of bird in the family Tyrannidae, the tyrant flycatchers. It is found from southern Bolivia to Tierra del Fuego. It is sometimes considered a subspecies of the white-crested elaenia.

Its natural habitats are temperate forests, subtropical or tropical moist montane forests, subtropical or tropical high-altitude shrubland, and heavily degraded former forest.

References

Chilean elaenia
Birds of the Southern Andes
Chilean elaenia